The 1932 United States presidential election in Missouri took place on November 8, 1932, as part of the 1932 United States presidential election. Voters chose 15 representatives, or electors, to the Electoral College, who voted for president and vice president.

Missouri was won by Governor Franklin D. Roosevelt (D–New York), running with Speaker John Nance Garner, with 63.39% of the popular vote, against incumbent President Herbert Hoover (R–California), running with Vice President Charles Curtis, with 35.08% of the popular vote.

This is the last election in which Cedar County, Dade County, Miller County, and Wright County have voted for a Democratic presidential nominee, and the only election since the Civil War when Unionist Ozark Camden County, Christian County and Stone County did so.

Results

Results by county

See also
 United States presidential elections in Missouri

References

Missouri
1932
1932 Missouri elections